Yisu Das Tiwari (1911–1997) was an Indian theologian and a leading participant in Hindu-Christian dialogue.

He was a scholar in Sanskrit, Hindi and Greek.  The Bible Society of India entrusted him with revision of the Hindi Bible (New Testament) into a contemporary version.

History
Yisu Das Tiwari was born Badri Prasad Tiwari into a Vaishnavite family in Agra in 1911 to Smt. Rajkunwar and Pandit Hari Govind Tiwari.  As a growing youth, Tiwari was influenced by Swami Dayananda Saraswati, founder of the Arya Samaj and Swami Rama Tirtha.

It was during his college days, that he came under the influence of Canon Holland, E. Stanley Jones, C. F. Andrews and others.  After a reading of the Gospel according to Saint John, he took keen interest in the studies of the Bible and devotional writings of Christian mystics. However, his newfound faith did not go well with his family members who sent him for internment to a mental asylum.

Tiwari however became a Christian and chose to be baptised in January 1935 under the aegis of the Baptist Missionary Society.

He later joined Mahatma Gandhi's Ashram in Wardha and began to follow Gandhi's teachings.

Simultaneously, Tiwari began growing in his new-found faith in Jesus Christ and chose to become a priest.  He was ordained by the Baptist Missionary Society.

Contribution

Translation of Scriptures
It was William Carey who first brought out the Hindi Bible

In the latter half of the twentieth century, the Bible Society of India took upon the task of translating the existing versions of the Bible into contemporary versions.  As early as 1956, the Hindi Common Language Translation Panel headed by Y. D. Tiwari came out with the Gospel according to Mark.  In due course of time, the other books of the New Testament were also translated from the original Greek into Hindi.

Translations (year-wise)
 1956, Gospel according to Mark in Hindi.
 1958, Epistle to the Philippians in Hindi.
 1959, Gospel according to John in Hindi.
 1961, Gospel according to St John in Hindi.
 1962, Four Gospels and the Acts of the Apostles in Hindi.
 1967, New Testament in Hindi.

Teaching

Tiwari began his career as a teacher in schools - Mission School, Kotgarh, Shimla, and Baptist Mission School, Agra, where he was the Head Master, before finally stepping onto the portals of seminaries.  He first taught at the North India United Theological College in Bareilly, Uttar Pradesh before he moved to Serampore College, Serampore, West Bengal.  He was Lecturer in Sanskrit and Philosophy of Religions at the Serampore College from 1963 to 1972. Notable among his students were D. S. Satyaranjan, Paulose Mar Paulose, G. Babu Rao and others.

Rev. Tiwari later taught at the Bishop's College, Kolkata from the academic year 1972-1973 onwards.

Appraisal
 K. V. Mathew, (Edinburgh), Professor of Old Testament, Mar Thoma Theological Seminary, Kottayam:

 K. P. Aleaz, D. Th. (South Asia Theological Research Institute), Professor of Religions, Bishop's College, Kolkata:

Honours

Baptist World Alliance
In the year 1955, Tiwari gave a talk on "We Preach Christ the Crucified Saviour" in London during the Golden Jubilee Celebrations of the Baptist World Alliance.

Senate of Serampore College (University)
India's first university, the Senate of Serampore College (University) in West Bengal conferred upon him a Doctor of Divinity, honoris causa in the year 1995.

See also
 D. S. Amalorpavadass
 Victor Premasagar

References

Further reading
 
 
 
 
 
 
 
 
 
 
 
 
 

Translators of the Bible into Hindi
Indian Christian theologians
21st-century Indian Christian clergy
Writers from Uttar Pradesh
Indian Baptist ministers
Converts to Protestantism from Hinduism
Christian and Hindu interfaith dialogue
Religious pluralism
1911 births
1997 deaths
Senate of Serampore College (University) alumni
20th-century Indian translators
Academic staff of the Senate of Serampore College (University)
People in interfaith dialogue